Quicklund is a Swedish language surname.

List of people with the surname 

 Carl Quicklund (born 1992), Swedish cross-country skier
 Saila Quicklund (born 1961), Swedish politician

See also 
 Lund
Quicksand (disambiguation)

Surnames of Swedish origin
Swedish-language surnames